Robert Stanley (184723 August 1918) was an Australian politician representing the electoral districts of Horsham and Lowan in the Victorian Legislative Assembly for the Commonwealth Liberal Party.

Biography

Stanley arrived in Australia in approximately c.1867. He was a miner at Ballarat, Victoria and in South Australia. He was a Shire Councillor on Shire of Wimmera from 1890 to 1906 and served as Shire President from 1891 till 1892 and again whilst in between electoral districts from 1905 until 1906.

He was married to Mary Jane Stanley (nee Strudwick) and fathered 5 sons and 4 daughters. He died in the Melbourne suburb of Northcote and was interred at Heidelberg Cemetery.

References

 

1847 births
1918 deaths
Members of the Victorian Legislative Assembly
Irish emigrants to colonial Australia
People from County Tipperary